Goniobranchus tritos is a species of colourful sea slug, a dorid nudibranch, a marine gastropod mollusk in the family Chromodorididae.

Distribution
This marine species occurs off the Maldives.

Description
Goniobranchus tritos has a cream coloured mantle with round black spots, each of which is outlined with a white line. There is a broad band of lilac-grey around the mantle and a narrow line of opaque white at the edge. The gills and rhinophores are grey with white highlights. The body reaches a length of 50 mm.

References
 

Chromodorididae
Gastropods described in 1994